National Oversight and Whistleblowers Centre (NOW) or in  is a Malaysian first national Non profit organisation dedicated to recognise the need to institute public-driven oversight initiatives and the role of whistleblower in the matured society.

It was co-founded in 2012 by Executive Director Rafizi Ramli and Director Akmal Nasir. NOW headquartered at Sungai Besi Kuala Lumpur.

Objectives 
 Monitor, Assess and Report
Act as an oversight body to monitor, assess and report independently of the performance, transparency and accountability of the governments (federal and state governments), parliamentary houses, major government agencies and major corporations with huge public interests
 Act Independently
Act independently and decisively to bring to the public's attention any issues or scandals with major repercussions to the public interests
 Whistleblower Right
Protect the safety, rights and welfare of whistleblowers through the Whistleblowers Protection Fund which disburses grants to qualified whistleblowers to pay for legal fees and loss of income
 Encouragement
Cultivate a conducive environment in the society that encourages whistleblowers to come forward without fear or fervour through policy advocacy, standard setting and campaign initiatives
 Training and Counsultancy
Provide training and consultancy to the public and organisations on the skills and accountability of whistleblowers with the aim to produce more responsible whistleblowers in the society

News 
NOW was accused by the Pertubuhan Minda dan Sosial Prihatin, Ramesh Rao for not having the Bank Negara permission to collect the Fund to Close the 1Malaysia Development Berhad (1MDB).

Police has investigated both NOW and Malaysian Islamic Economic Development Foundation (YaPEIM) following their report against each other.

References

External links 
 The National Oversight & Whistleblowers (NOW) Website 
 Rafizi Ramli Website

2012 establishments in Malaysia
Non-profit organisations based in Malaysia
Political organisations based in Malaysia
Political advocacy groups in Malaysia
Whistleblowing in Malaysia
Whistleblower support organizations